Gavan Neil Levenson (born 18 December 1953) is a South African professional golfer.

Levenson was born in Johannesburg. He represented South Africa in the 1976 Eisenhower Trophy and won several major amateur tournaments including the French and Rhodesian Open Amateur Championships in 1978. He turned professional later that year and joined the European Tour the following year, winning the Belgian Open and finishing in 29th place on the Order of Merit in his rookie season.

After two seasons in Europe, Levenson qualified for the United States-based PGA Tour. He spent four largely unsuccessful years on the tour, only recording one top ten finish when he tied for 4th place at the 1982 Greater Hartford Open. He returned to Europe in 1985, and although he consistently finished inside the top 100 on the Order of Merit, he did not win again on the European Tour until the 1991 Open de Baleares.

Levenson also played on the Southern Africa Tour (now the Sunshine Tour) during the northern hemisphere winters. He won five titles in South Africa, including one South African Open Championship and one South African PGA Championship, and topped the Order of Merit in 1983/84.

Since turning fifty, Levenson has played on the European Seniors Tour, where he has one victory, achieved in just his second tournament, the 2004 DGM Barbados Open.

Amateur wins (3)
1975 South African Amateur Stroke-Play Championship
1978 French Amateur Open Championship, Rhodesian Amateur Open Championship

Professional wins (8)

European Tour wins (2)

Sunshine Tour wins (5)

European Senior Tour wins (1)

Results in major championships

Note: Levenson never played in the Masters Tournament.

CUT = missed the half-way cut
"T" = tied

Team appearances
Amateur
Commonwealth Tournament (representing South Africa): 1975
Eisenhower Trophy (representing South Africa): 1976

See also
Spring 1981 PGA Tour Qualifying School graduates
1983 PGA Tour Qualifying School graduates

External links

South African male golfers
Sunshine Tour golfers
European Tour golfers
European Senior Tour golfers
PGA Tour golfers
Golfers from Johannesburg
1953 births
Living people
20th-century South African people